The PSA Prepayment Model is a prepayment scale developed by the Public Securities Association in 1985 for analyzing American mortgage-backed securities. The PSA model assumes increasing prepayment rates for the first 30 months after mortgage origination and a constant prepayment rate thereafter. This approximates real-world experience that during the first few years, mortgage borrowers:
 are less likely to relocate to a different home,
 are less likely to refinance into a new mortgage, and
 are less likely to make extra payments of principal.

The standard model (also called "100% PSA") works as follows: Starting with an annualized prepayment rate of 0.2% in month 1, the rate increases by 0.2% each month, until it reaches 6% in month 30. From the 30th month onward, the model assumes an annualized prepayment rate of 6% of the remaining balance. Each monthly prepayment is assumed to represent full payoff of individual loans, rather than a partial prepayment that leaves a loan with a reduced principal balance.

Variations of the model are expressed in percent; e.g., "150% PSA" means a monthly increase of 0.3% in the annualized prepayment rate, until the peak of 9% is reached after 30 months. The months thereafter have a constant annualized prepayment rate of 9%.

1667% PSA is roughly equivalent to 100% prepayment rate in month 30 or later.

References 

Mortgage-backed security
Fixed income analysis
Financial models